Thomas Champion (born 8 September 1999) is a French cyclist, who currently rides for UCI WorldTeam .

Career
Champion began cycling at the age of 6 with the VS Clissonnais club, and competed primarily in mountain biking as a junior. In 2016, he began to also compete in road cycling, finishing 8th in the La Philippe Gilbert Juniors.

In 2021, Champion joined UCI WorldTeam  on a two-year contract.

Major results
2016
 8th La Philippe Gilbert Juniors
2017
 4th Overall Ain Bugey Valromey Tour
2020
 3rd Marathon, National Mountain Bike Championships
 4th Overall Le Tour de Savoie Mont Blanc
 9th Overall Ronde de l'Isard

Grand Tour general classification results timeline

References

External links

1999 births
Living people
French male cyclists
Cyclists from Loire-Atlantique